Built Environment is a peer-reviewed academic journal focused on urban planning and related fields. It began in 1956 as Official Architecture and Planning and was renamed Built Environment in 1972. Between 1975 and 1978 it was known as Built Environment Quarterly. Topics discussed in the journal include: "architecture, conservation, economic development, environmental planning, health, housing, regeneration, social issues, spatial planning, sustainability, urban design, and transport." As of 2020, David Banister, Stephen Marshall, and Lucy Natarajan serve as editors. The commercial Alexandrine Press in the UK publishes the journal. Issues appear four times per year.

See also
 List of planning journals

References

External links
 

Quarterly journals
English-language journals
Urban studies and planning journals